Juan Carlos Tabío (3 September 1943 – 18 January 2021) was a Cuban film director and screenwriter. His film Strawberry and Chocolate (1994), which he co-directed with Tomás Gutiérrez Alea, won a Silver Bear - Special Jury Prize at the 44th Berlin International Film Festival, and was also nominated for the Academy Award for Best Foreign Language Film. He has collaborated with director and close friend Tomás Gutiérrez Alea and actors Jorge Perugorría, Vladimir Cruz and Mirta Ibarra in several films.

His 2000 film, Lista de Espera, was screened in the Un Certain Regard section at the 2000 Cannes Film Festival.

Biography
Juan Carlos Tabío was born in 1943 in Havana, Cuba. Although his illustrious filmmaking career spanned nearly three decades, his initial involvement in the genre came as an accident. When he was young, his parents prepared him for a career in politics. It was not until a family friend who worked for the national cinemagraphic society invited him to work on a film that Tabío gave filmmaking a thought as a career.
 
Juan Carlos Tabío began working in 1961 at the ICAIC (Cuban Institute of Art and Cinematographic Industry) as a production assistant, then as assistant director.

Between 1963 and 1980, he produced more than 30 documentaries. His first feature film (Se Swap) was released in 1983. Tabío then taught screenwriting and filmmaking at the International School of Film and Television of San Antonio de los Baños between 1989 and 1990.

Tabío’s films are mostly comedies starring the people and places in Cuba. Using Cuba as an actor in and of itself allows him to both highlight the joys of the Cuban culture while also create a running social commentary on its flaws.

Juan Carlos Tabío was rewarded for his work on several occasions and received the Goya Awards including Best Foreign Language Film for Fresa y Chocolate (Strawberry and Chocolate).

In 2000 he directed The Waiting List, which tells the humorous story of a group of passengers waiting for a bus that will never appear. The use of humor and realistic dialogue takes the edge off of Tabío’s social commentary and illustration of the problems Cuba faces.

Juan Carlos Tabío demonstrated once again his penchant for the satirical comedy with the release of his latest feature film, The Cornucopia.

Films
2012 7 days in Havana
2008 Horn of Plenty
2003 Aunque estés lejos
2000 Lista de Espera (Waiting List)
1998 Enredando sombras (documentary) 
1998 Lorca en La Habana (TV short) 
1995 Guantanamera 
1994 El elefante y la bicicleta
1993 Fresa y Chocolate (Strawberry and Chocolate)
1988 Demasiado miedo a la vida o Plaff 
1987 La entrevista (short) 
1986 Dolly back (short) 
1984 Se permuta
1975 Sonia Silvestre (short) 
1974 Chicho Ibáñez (documentary short) 
1974 Soledad Bravo (documentary short) 
1973 Miriam Makeba (short)

Bibliography 
 Juan-Navarro, Santiago. “Brecht en La Habana: autorrefencialidad, desfamiliarización y cine dentro del cine en la obra de Juan Carlos Tabío”. Le cinéma cubain: identité et regards de l’intérieur. Ed. Sandra Hernández. Nantes: Centre de Recherche sur les Identités Nationales et l´Interculturalité - Université de Nantes, 2006. 125-135. Leer artículo

References

External links

 Havana Cultura 

1943 births
2021 deaths
Cuban film directors
Cuban screenwriters
Cuban male writers
Male screenwriters
People from Havana